Armilla is a municipality of Spain located in the province of Granada, in the autonomous community of Andalusia. It lies on the Vega de Granada, 4 km from the provincial capital's city centre. Armilla limits with the municipalities of Granada, Ogíjares, Alhendín and Churriana de la Vega.

The biggest population growth registered was in the twentieth century.

International relations
Green Twinning project
 Ilion, Greece (since 2013).

References 

Municipalities in the Province of Granada